Abdullah Kadhem Ruaid (1 January 1925 — 2 January 2011) was a former Arab Socialist Ba'ath Party official in the Dujail region of Iraq and the father of Mizher Abdullah Roweed Al-Musheikhi. He was arrested in 2005 by A/1-128 of the Wisconsin Army National Guard.  He was convicted of involvement in the killings of 148 Shia Muslims during the Al-Dujail trial of Saddam Hussein, and was sentenced to 15 years in prison.

Ruaid died in prison at the age of 86 on January 2, 2011, ten years before the end of his sentence.

References

1925 births
Year of birth uncertain

2011 deaths
Iraqi people convicted of crimes against humanity
Prisoners and detainees of Iraq
Arab Socialist Ba'ath Party – Iraq Region politicians
Iraqi politicians convicted of crimes